Kafentzis is a surname. Notable people with the surname include:

Austin Kafentzis (born 1996), American football player
Kurt Kafentzis (born 1962), American football player, brother of Mark
Mark Kafentzis (born 1958), American football player